Dardaghan (also spelled al-Dardaghan) is a village in central Syria, administratively part of the Homs Governorate, located southeast of Homs. Nearby localities include Jandar to the west, Hisyah to the southwest and al-Riqama to the northeast. According to the Central Bureau of Statistics (CBS), Dardaghan had a population of 1,497 in the 2004 census.

References

Populated places in Homs District